Do You Wanna Start a War is the sixth studio album from the heavy metal band Fozzy. It was released on July 22, 2014 through Century Media Records. It is the band's first album to feature the same lineup as the previous one.

Background
In 2013, it was confirmed that Fozzy would begin working on a new record in 2014 and would be looking for a release date during the summer of 2014. The band entered the studio in late January. The first single, "Lights Go Out", was released on April 29. Following the release of the new single, the band embarked on the Lights Go Out Tour to promote their new album, playing festivals such as Carolina Rebellion, Rock on the Range, and Download Festival (where they performed on the main stage for the first time in their history). The second single, "One Crazed Anarchist" – also the title of singer Chris Jericho's entrance theme when he performed for World Championship Wrestling (WCW) – was released on May 26 and was given away to people that pre-ordered the album. The album was released on July 22 in North America.

Reception
The album premiered at No. 54 on the American Billboard 200 chart and marks the band's best-selling first week ever, selling approximately 5,600 copies in its first week.

Track listing

Charts

Personnel

Musicians

 Chris Jericho – lead vocals
 Rich Ward – guitar, backing vocals
 Paul Di Leo – bass
 Frank Fontsere – drums
 Billy Grey  – guitar

Additional Musicians
 Michael Starr – additional vocals on "Tonight"
 Christie Cook – co-lead vocals on "Unstoppable"

References

Fozzy albums
2014 albums
Century Media Records albums